NSW TrainLink is a train operator of passenger services outside the metropolitan area of Sydney in New South Wales. The network is divided into two tiers; intercity – a commuter-based rail network centred on the Greater Sydney area, and regional – long distance and interstate services. The network is served by a fleet of double-deck electric multiple units and single-deck diesel trains.

For stations within the Sydney metropolitan area and shared with Sydney Trains, see List of Sydney Trains railway stations. 


Stations

See also 
 List of Sydney Trains railway stations
 Transportation in Australia
 Lists of railway stations

References

External links
Station details – Transport for NSW - Transport for NSW Info website showing details for all stations

Regional railway stations in New South Wales